Montilla may refer to:

As a surname:
Agustin Montilla y Orendain 
Gil Montilla (1876 – after 1938), Filipino politician
José Montilla (born 1955), Spanish politician

Places:
Montilla, a municipality in Spain

Other:
Montilla-Moriles, a Spanish wine region and the wines it produces